Shamsabad (also Romanized as Shamsābād) is a village in Pirakuh Rural District, in the Central District of Jowayin County, Razavi Khorasan Province, Iran. At the 2006 census, its population was 76, in 23 families.

References 

Populated places in Joveyn County